La Motte is a small city in northern Jackson County, Iowa, United States. The population was 237 at the time of the 2020 census.

History
La Motte was planned in 1873, and the town voted to incorporate in 1879.  It is named after Alexander La Motte, one of its founders.

In 1878, La Motte contained two stores, a Methodist church, a Masonic lodge, and a carriage factory.

Two sites in La Motte are listed on the National Register of Historic Places: the Chicago, Milwaukee & St. Paul Narrow Gauge Depot, and the Harris Wagon and Carriage Shop.

Geography
La Motte is located at  (42.294910, -90.620455), in hilly countryside west of Bellevue.

Demographics

2010 census
As of the census of 2010, there were 260 people, 106 households, and 80 families living in the city. The racial makeup of the city was 96.2% White and 3.8% from two or more races.

There were 106 households, of which 32.1% had children under the age of 18 living with them, 66.0% were married couples living together, 4.7% had a female householder with no husband present, 4.7% had a male householder with no wife present, and 24.5% were non-families. 20.8% of all households were made up of individuals, and 7.5% had someone living alone who was 65 years of age or older. The average household size was 2.45 and the average family size was 2.84.

The median age in the city was 40 years. 24.6% of residents were under the age of 18; 4.3% were between the ages of 18 and 24; 28.9% were from 25 to 44; 27.3% were from 45 to 64; and 15% were 65 years of age or older. The gender makeup of the city was 51.5% male and 48.5% female.

2000 census
As of the census of 2000, there were 272 people, 105 households, and 80 families living in the city. The racial makeup of the city was 99.26% White, and 0.74% from two or more races.

There were 105 households, out of which 30.5% had children under the age of 18 living with them, 66.7% were married couples living together, 6.7% had a female householder with no husband present, and 23.8% were non-families. 17.1% of all households were made up of individuals, and 7.6% had someone living alone who was 65 years of age or older. The average household size was 2.59 and the average family size was 2.98.

In the city, the population was spread out, with 23.5% under the age of 18, 8.5% from 18 to 24, 29.4% from 25 to 44, 23.2% from 45 to 64, and 15.4% who were 65 years of age or older. The median age was 38 years. For every 100 females, there were 98.5 males. For every 100 females age 18 and over, there were 103.9 males.

The median income for a household in the city was $35,625, and the median income for a family was $38,125. Males had a median income of $33,750 versus $25,694 for females. The per capita income for the city was $19,794. About 4.7% of families and 9.0% of the population were below the poverty line, including 15.1% of those under the age of eighteen and 5.9% of those 65 or over.

Education
Bellevue Community School District operates local area schools.   Andrew community School District.

Notable person
N. B. Nemmers, state legislator and mayor of La Motte

References

External links
LaMotte website

Cities in Iowa
Cities in Jackson County, Iowa
1873 establishments in Iowa
Populated places established in 1873